LaRue is a village in Marion County, Ohio, United States. The population was 747 at the 2010 census. The village is served by Elgin Local School District. LaRue has a public library, a branch of Marion Public Library.

Geography
LaRue is located at  (40.577262, −83.382396).

Demographics

2010 census
As of the census of 2010, there were 747 people, 291 households, and 202 families living in the village. The racial makeup of the village was 94.9% White, 0.3% African American, 0.1% Native American, 2.5% from other races, and 2.1% from two or more races. Hispanic or Latino of any race were 3.7% of the population.

There were 291 households, of which 29.9% had children under the age of 18 living with them, 53.3% were married couples living together, 10.7% had a female householder with no husband present, 5.5% had a male householder with no wife present, and 30.6% were non-families. 25.4% of all households were made up of individuals, and 13.1% had someone living alone who was 65 years of age or older. The average household size was 2.57 and the average family size was 3.03.

The median age in the village was 39.8 years. 25.4% of residents were under the age of 18; 6.5% were between the ages of 18 and 24; 23.9% were from 25 to 44; 26.7% were from 45 to 64; and 17.5% were 65 years of age or older. The gender makeup of the village was 48.9% male and 51.1% female.

2000 census
As of the census of 2000, there were 775 people, 308 households, and 207 families living in the village. The population density was 1,608.5 people per square mile (623.4/km2). There were 330 housing units at an average density of 684.9 per square mile (265.4/km2). The racial makeup of the village was 99.23% White, 0.13% Native American, and 0.65% from two or more races. Hispanic or Latino of any race were 0.13% of the population.

There were 308 households, out of which 31.8% had children under the age of 18 living with them, 54.9% were married couples living together, 9.1% had a female householder with no husband present, and 32.5% were non-families. 27.6% of all households were made up of individuals, and 15.6% had someone living alone who was 65 years of age or older. The average household size was 2.51 and the average family size was 3.01.

In the village, the population was spread out, with 26.8% under the age of 18, 7.6% from 18 to 24, 28.8% from 25 to 44, 18.6% from 45 to 64, and 18.2% who were 65 years of age or older. The median age was 37 years. For every 100 females there were 97.2 males. For every 100 females age 18 and over, there were 88.4 males.

The median income for a household in the village was $34,375, and the median income for a family was $44,808. Males had a median income of $27,250 versus $25,238 for females. The per capita income for the village was $15,873. About 4.4% of families and 7.8% of the population were below the poverty line, including 9.5% of those under age 18 and 3.0% of those age 65 or over.

History
In the early 19th-century, prior to their removal in the 1830s, there was a Wyandot village at this location.

LaRue had its start in the early 1850s when the railroad was extended to that point. A post office has been in operation at LaRue since 1853.

LaRue was home to Walter Lingo, owner of the Oorang Dog Kennels, which bred the nationally recognized King Oorang Airedale Terriers. Lingo also owned the National Football League's Oorang Indians, which played in 1922 and 1923. The team consisted of Native American players and was led by Jim Thorpe. They were strictly a traveling team; of the 20 games they played over two seasons, only one was played at "home" in nearby Marion. LaRue remains the smallest town ever to have been the home of an NFL franchise, or probably any professional team in any league in the United States.

Events
A festival called the "Oorang Bang" in honor of the Oorang Indians, Thorpe, and Oorang Airedales was held on the second weekend of June, featuring a parade, food, rides, and live music. The festival was first organized by local resident Harry Roberts (1924–2003) to fund improvements to the then derelict municipal swimming pool and park, located one mile (1.6 km) north of the village.

The Marion County Raceway is located in LaRue.

Notable people
 Edgar Bain – metallurgist who developed techniques for alloying steel
 Toby Harrah – baseball player, played high school baseball in LaRue
 Walter Lingo – dog kennel owner and owner of the Oorang Indians football team
 Gladys Milligan – painter
 Grant E. Mouser – U.S. Representative from Ohio
 Dr. Charles E. Sawyer – a homeopathic physician who is blamed for giving a false diagnosis of U.S. President Warren G. Harding that led to Harding's premature death, practiced medicine in LaRue.
 Major General Richard Secord – figure in the Iran-Contra scandal

References

External links

 Village website
 History of LaRue Village
 LaRue, Ohio – Historic Pictures
  History of the Oorang Indians

Villages in Marion County, Ohio
Villages in Ohio
French-American culture in Ohio
1853 establishments in Ohio
Populated places established in 1853